Death Is Forever, first published in 1992, was the twelfth novel by John Gardner to feature Ian Fleming's secret agent, James Bond (including Gardner's novelization of Licence to Kill). Carrying the Glidrose Publications copyright, it was first published in the United Kingdom by Hodder & Stoughton and in the United States by Putnam.

Death Is Forever is significant as the first James Bond novel to be published after the collapse of the Soviet Union and the end of the Cold War, two elements that were part and parcel of Bond's creation 40 years earlier.

Plot summary
The aftermath of the Cold War provides the setting for the plot of Death Is Forever. After the deaths of a British Intelligence agent and an American agent with the CIA working in Germany under mysterious and surprisingly old-fashioned circumstances, James Bond and CIA agent Elizabeth Zara ("Easy") St. John are assigned to track down the surviving members of "Cabal", a Cold War-era intelligence network that received a mysterious and unauthorised signal to disband. Soon, Bond finds himself playing a life-or-death game of "Who do You Trust?" as he and Easy track down Wolfgang Weisen, the power responsible for killing off Cabal's members one by one. Bond uncovers Weisen's plot to kill off the heads of each European country during the inaugural run of the Eurostar from London to Paris in an effort to create havoc in the west and usher in a second era of Communism.

More than most other Gardner novels, Death Is Forever is grounded in contemporary events, with the fallout from the end of the Cold War and the failed 1991 Russian coup being important backdrops to the story. The Eurotunnel connecting England and France, which was still under construction at the time the book was written, also serves as a major setting.

Publication history
 UK first hardback edition: July 1992 Hodder & Stoughton
 U.S. first hardback edition: June 1992 Putnam
 UK first paperback edition: July 1993 Coronet Books
 U.S. first paperback edition: August 1993 Berkley Books

See also
 Outline of James Bond

References

1992 British novels
James Bond books
Novels by John Gardner (British writer)
Hodder & Stoughton books